Saints Will Conquer is the first live album by American heavy metal band Armored Saint recorded during the Raising Fear tour. It was recorded on October 9, 1987, at the Agora Ballroom in Cleveland and released on August 19, 1988, on Metal Blade Records. This short live set does not represent the first era of the band well, missing songs like fan favorite "March of the Saint" and their radio hit "Isolation". The album features a previously unreleased studio version of "No Reason to Live" from their first demo from 1983.

Track listing

All tracks written by Armored Saint, except where noted.

Credits 

John Bush -  vocals
Dave Prichard - lead guitar (tracks 1-8 and 9-13 of the 2009 compilation)
Joey Vera - bass
Gonzo Sandoval - drums
Phil Sandoval - lead guitar (tracks 1-8 of the 2009 compilation)
Jeff Duncan -  rhythm guitar (tracks 1-8 of the 2009 compilation)

References

External links 
Official Armored Saint Site
[ Armored Saint on Allmusic Guide]
Armored Saint's Saints Will Conquer on Encyclopaedia Metallum

Armored Saint albums
1988 live albums
Metal Blade Records live albums